Toghon Temür (25 May 1320 – 23 May 1370), also known by his temple name as the Emperor Huizong of Yuan bestowed by the Northern Yuan dynasty and by his posthumous name as the Emperor Shun of Yuan bestowed by the Ming dynasty, was the last emperor of the Yuan dynasty and later the first emperor of the Northern Yuan dynasty. Apart from Emperor of China, he is also considered the last Khagan of the Mongol Empire. He was a son of Kusala (Emperor Mingzong).

During the last years of his reign, the Yuan dynasty was overthrown by the Red Turban Rebellion, which established the Ming dynasty, although the Yuan court under his rule remained in control of northern China and the Mongolian Plateau. The remnant Yuan regime is known as the Northern Yuan in historiography.

Emperor Huizong was a Buddhist student of the Karmapas (heads of the Karma Kagyu school of Tibetan Buddhism) and is considered a previous incarnation of the Tai Situpas. He also notably invited the Jonang savant Dölpopa Shérab Gyeltsen to teach him, but was rebuffed.

Before succession
Toghon Temür was born to Kuśala, known as Khutughtu Khan or Emperor Mingzong, when he was in exile in Central Asia. Toghon Temür's mother was Mailaiti, descendant of Arslan Khan, the chief of the Karluks. According to a folk legend, the former Chinese Southern Song Emperor Gong of Song, Zhao Xian, had an affair with Yuan Empress Mailaiti. Zhao Xian allegedly fathered Yuan Toghon Temür with Mailaiti as a bastard child. The Mongols circulated a similar story about the Yongle Emperor.

Following the civil war known as the War of the Two Capitals that broke out after the death of Yesün Temür (Emperor Taiding) in 1328, Toghon Temür attended his father and entered Shangdu from Mongolia. However, after Kuśala died and his younger brother was restored to the throne as Jayaatu Khan Tugh Temür (Emperor Wenzong), he was kept from the court and was banished to Goryeo (modern Korea) and later to Guangxi in South China. While he was in exile, his stepmother Babusha was executed.

When Emperor Wenzong died in 1332, his widow, Empress Dowager Budashiri respected his will to make the son of Kuśala's succeed to the throne instead of Wenzong's own son, El Tegüs. However, it was not Toghon Temür but his younger half-brother Rinchinbal, who was enthroned as Rinchinbal Khan (Emperor Ningzong). However, he died only two months into his reign. The de facto ruler, El Temür, attempted to install El Tegüs as emperor but was stopped by Empress Budashiri. As a result, Toghon Temür was summoned back from Guangxi. El Temür feared that Toghon Temür, who was too mature to be a puppet, would take arms against him since he was suspected of the assassination of Toghon Temür's father, Emperor Mingzong. The enthronement was postponed for six months until El Temür died in 1333.

In 1333, Toghon Temür first met Lady Gi, a Korean concubine, with whom he fell deeply in love. Lady Ki had been sent to China sometime in the late 1320s as "human tribute" as the kings of Goryeo were required to send a certain number of beautiful teenage girls to Yuan to serve as concubines after the Mongol invasions.

Reign

Early reign
The new emperor appointed his cousin El Tegüs crown prince as he was ward of El Tegüs' mother Empress Dowager Budashiri, but he was controlled by warlords even after El Temür's death. Among them, Bayan became as powerful as El Temür had been. He served as minister of the Secretariat and crushed a rebellion by El Temür's son Tang Ki-se. During his despotic rule, he made several purges and also suspended the imperial examination system. When Toghon Temür tried to promote Lady Ki to secondary wife, which was contrary to the standard practice of only taking secondary wives from Mongol clans, it created such opposition at court to this unheard of promotion for a Korean woman that he was forced to back down. In 1339, when Lady Ki gave birth to a son, whom Toghon Temür decided would be his successor, he was finally able to have Lady Ki named his secondary wife in 1340.

As Toghon Temür matured, he came to disfavor Bayan's autocratic rule. In 1340 he allied with Bayan's nephew Toqto'a, who was in discord with Bayan, and banished Bayan in a coup. He also removed El Tegüs and Empress Budashiri from court. With the help of Toqto'a, he also managed to purge officials that had dominated the administration.

Middle reign

With the dismissal of Bayan, Toqto'a seized the power of the court. His first administration clearly exhibited fresh new spirit. The young leader was quick to distinguish his regime as something wholly different from Bayan's. A new Chinese era name, Zhizheng, was decreed to show this. Bayan's purges were called off. Many of the great Chinese literati came back to the capital from voluntary retirement or from administrative exile and the imperial examination system was restored.

Toqto'a also gave a few early signs of a new and positive direction in central government. One of his successful projects was to finish the long-stalled official histories of the Liao, Jin and Song dynasties, which were eventually completed in 1345.

Toqto'a resigned his office with the approval of Toghon Temür in June 1344, which marked the end of his first administration. The several short-lived administrations that followed from 1344 and 1349 would develop an agenda very different from Toqto'a's. In 1347, the emperor forced Toqto'a into Gansu with assistance from former officers of Kuśala and Yesün Temür.

In 1349, Toghon Temür recalled Toqto'a, which began Toqto'a's second and very different administration.

Late reign

Since the late 1340s, people in the countryside suffered from frequent natural disasters, droughts, floods, and ensuing famines. The lack of effective government policy led to a loss of support from the people. Illicit salt dealers who were disaffected by the government's salt monopoly raised a rebellion in 1348, triggering many revolts around the empire. Among them was the Red Turban Rebellion, which started in 1351 and grew into a nationwide turmoil.

In 1354, when Toqto'a led a large army to crush the Red Turban rebels, Toghon Temür suddenly dismissed him for fear of betrayal. This resulted in the restoration of Toghon Temür's power but also a rapid weakening of the central government. Thus he had no choice but to rely on the forces of local warlords.

Toghon Temür gradually lost interest in politics and ceased to intervene in political struggles. His son Biligtü Khan, who became Crown Prince in 1353, attempted to seize power and came into conflict with Toghon Temür's aides, who dominated politics instead of the khan. During this time power was increasingly exercised by Lady Ki. Chief Empress Lady Ki and his minister persuaded Biligtü Khan to overthrow the latter. Toghon Temür was unable to conciliate the dispute but executed the minister. In 1364 the Shanxi-based warlord Bolad Temür occupied Khanbaliq and expelled the Crown Prince from the winter base. In alliance with the Henan-based warlord Köke Temür, Biligtü Khan defeated Bolad Temür in the next year. This internal struggle resulted in further weakening of the political and military power of the central government. In 1365, Toghon Temür finally promoted his much beloved Lady Ki to First Empress and announced that his son by her would be the first in the line of succession.

During the Yuan dynasty, one of Confucius' descendants, who was one of the Duke Yansheng Kong Huan's 孔浣 sons, named Kong Shao 孔紹, moved from China to Goryeo era Korea and established a branch of the family there called the Gong clan of Qufu after marrying a Korean woman (Jo Jin-gyeong's 曹晉慶 daughter) during Toghon Temür's rule. (Also see 曲阜孔氏 (朝鲜半岛) and 곡부 공씨)

Relations with other nations

Avignon Papacy

Pope John XXII and Pope Benedict XII successfully extended a network of Catholic churches throughout the Mongol Empire from Crimea to China between 1317 and 1343. The archbishop of Khanbaliq, John of Montecorvino, died in 1328. With the backing of the Toghon Temür, the Alans wrote to Pope Benedict XII in 1336 asking for a new metropolitan. In 1338, the pope sent back the embassy headed by Giovanni de' Marignolli, who stayed at Beijing three or four years. They brought gifts for Toghon Temür that included fine European horses.

Japan
When the Koreans captured a Japanese fishing ship they thought was spying, the Goryeo court sent it to their overlord, the Yuan emperor Toghon Temür, who then sent the fishermen back to Japan. In reply, the Ashikaga shogunate sent an embassy led by a monk to express its gratitude.

Retreat to the north

After absorbing the Chen Han dynasty, conquering Southern China, and establishing the Ming dynasty, Zhu Yuanzhang – crowned as the Hongwu Emperor – conducted military expeditions to North China and defeated the Yuan army in 1368. When Köke Temür lost battles against the Ming general Xu Da and Ming troops approached Hebei, Toghon Temür gave up Khanbaliq and fled to his summer base, Shangdu.

In 1369 when Shangdu also fell under the Ming's occupation, Toghon Temür fled northward to Yingchang, which was located in present-day Inner Mongolia. He died there in 1370; his son succeeded him as Biligtü Khan Ayushiridara and retreated to Karakorum in the same year. The Yuan remnants ruled northern China and the Mongolian Plateau while they continued to claim the title of Emperor of China, from which point they are referred to as the Northern Yuan dynasty. He was the longest-lived emperor of Yuan China after Kublai Khan.

At the time of his death, the Northern Yuan maintained its influence, stretching the domination from the Sea of Japan to the Altai Mountains. There were also pro-Yuan, anti-Ming forces in Yunnan and Guizhou. Even though its control over China proper had not been stable yet, the Ming considered that the Yuan lost the Mandate of Heaven when it abandoned Khanbaliq, and that the Yuan was overthrown in 1368. The Ming did not treat Toghon Temür after 1368 and his successor Ayushiridara as legitimate emperors.

The Ming gave Toghon Temür the posthumous name Emperor Shun (順皇帝), which implied that he followed the Mandate of Heaven ceding his empire to the Ming. But the Northern Yuan dynasty gave him their own posthumous name Emperor Xuanren Puxiao (宣仁普孝皇帝) and temple name Huizong (惠宗).

Even after Toghon Temür, there was still Yuan resistance to the Ming in the south. In southwestern China, Basalawarmi, the self-styled "Prince of Liang", established a Yuan resistance movement in Yunnan and Guizhou that was not put down until 1381.

Legacy

Mongolian chronicles such as the Erdeniin Tobchi include a poem known as the Lament of Toghon Temür. It deals with his grieving after the loss of Khanbaliq (Beijing).

Family 
Consorts and their respective issue(s):
First Empress Consort: Empress Danashiri (答纳失里皇后) (1320 – 1335), of the  Kipchak tribe (钦察部人), daughter of El Temür
Prince Maha (摩訶王) (12 May 1334 – 23 November 1334)
Second Empress Consort: Empress Bayan Khutugh (伯颜忽都皇后) (1324 – 1365),  of the Hongjila clan (弘吉剌氏) from Onggirat, daughter of Bolod Temür 
Prince Zhenjin (真金)
Prince Xueshan (雪山)
Third Empress Consort: Empress Gi (奇皇后) (1315 – 1369) of the Korean Haengju Gi clan (幸州 奇氏) 
Emperor Zhaozong of Northern Yuan (北元昭宗) (23 January 1340 – 28 April/26 May 1378)
Miscarriage at 4 months in 1347.
Pure Consort, of the Chinese Long clan (淑妃 龍氏), personal name Ruijjao (瑞嬌)
Pure Consort, of the Cheng clan (淑妃 程氏) (1333 – 1368), personal name Yining (一寧)
Consort, of the Korean Gyoha No clan (妃交河盧氏)
Pure Consort, of the Ge clan (淑妃 戈氏), personal name Xiaoge (小娥)
Concubine Li (麗嬪), of the Zhang clan (張氏), personal name Ayuan/Axuan (阿元/阿玄)
Talented Lady (才人), of the Ning clan (凝氏), personal name Xiang'er (香兒)
Unknwon
Emperor Tianyuan of Northern Yuan  (兀思哈勒汗, b. 1342)

In popular culture
Portrayed by Lee Suk-koo in the 2005–2006 MBC TV series Shin Don.
Portrayed by Ji Chang-wook in the 2013-2014 MBC TV series Empress Ki.

See also 
 List of Yuan emperors
 List of Mongol rulers
 List of Chinese monarchs
 List of Northern Yuan khans

Notes

References

Sources
 

|-

|-

|-

Great Khans of the Mongol Empire
Yuan dynasty emperors
Northern Yuan rulers
14th-century Chinese monarchs
14th-century Mongol rulers
1320 births
1370 deaths
Child monarchs from Asia
Yuan dynasty Buddhists
Chinese Buddhist monarchs
Founding monarchs
Mongolian Buddhist monarchs